Eupithecia purpureoviridis is a moth in the family Geometridae first described by William Warren in 1900. It is found in Ecuador.

References

Moths described in 1900
purpureoviridis
Moths of South America